Love and Leashes is a 2022 South Korean romantic comedy film, based on the webtoon  Moral Sense by Gyeoul. The film directed by Park Hyun-jin and starring Seohyun and Lee Jun-young, depicts a romance between Ji-hoo, who has everything perfect but has secret BDSM desires, and Ji-woo, a competent public relations team member who finds out about his secret. It was released on Netflix on February 11, 2022, to coincide with Valentine's Day.

Cast

Main 
 Seohyun as Jung Ji-woo
 Lee Jun-young as Jung Ji-hoo

Supporting 
 Lee El as Hye Mi, Jung Ji-woo's best friend, dog pub owner
 Seo Hyun-woo as Team Leader Hwang
 Kim Han-na as Yuna, Jiwoo's co-worker
  as Woo Hyuk, a part-time worker who is obsessed with a dog pub run by Hye Mi.
 Kim Bo-ra as Hana, Jung Ji-hoo's ex-lover 
 Baek Hyun-joo as Jung Ji-woo's mother
 Ahn Seung-gyun as Lee Han, the youngest employee

Production

Development
In February 2021, at the Netflix content road show 'See What's Next Korea 2021', they announced the production of a romance film tentatively titled as Moral Sense.

Casting
On March 21, 2021, Netflix confirmed through a press release that it would distribute another Korean original film Moral Sense, based on webtoon of the same name. It further revealed that the romance film would be directed by Park Hyun-jin, and have Seohyun and Lee Jun-young as main leads.

Filming 
On April 19, 2021, Seohyun posted photos from shooting site revealing that filming was in progress.

Reception
The review aggregator website Rotten Tomatoes reported a 80% approval rating, based on 5 reviews with an average rating of 6.20/10.

Kim Junmo writing for OhmyNews stated that the film has a message and the attributes of a romantic comedy. Kim wrote, "as it is a story about the minority taste of BDSM, the difference between likes and dislikes is a limitation of this film." Kim opined, "the barrier to entry is high. Above all, scenes containing BDSM's actions are the core of sympathy between the two main characters, but it is difficult to universally provide emotional pleasure, catharsis, and excitement." Kate Sánchez rated the film with 8.5 out of 10 and wrote, "Love and Leashes is sweet and sensual. It's a wholesome look at boundaries and love while also taking time to explore kink in a context that doesn't treat it as something dangerous or abnormal... one of the best representations of kink I've seen in a film." Ricardo Gallegos of La Estatuilla praised the performances of Seohyun and direction stating, "Park Hyun-jin does a good job of weaving the threads of the story together and adding a touch of respectful humor to the story's development." Concluding Gallegos wrote, "Although "Amarrados al amor" manages to use classic and conventional elements of the romantic comedy genre, it stands out thanks to its sweet handling of the central relationship, the sensuality that it transmits in its exploration of sexual freedom and its honest intentions to inform and break taboos."

James Marsh of the South China Morning Post rated the film with 3 out of 5 stars and praised the performances of lead pair writing,  "Seohyun and Lee Jun-young deliver sweet and wholesome performances". Marsh opined that the film has made "efforts to normalise BDSM and erase its stigma," and it has come out as  "a sweet and well-meaning workplace romance". March concluded "Love and Leashes is a commendable effort to lift the blindfold on a stigmatised subculture, albeit without the reward of any lasting gratification."

Accolades

References

External links
 
 
 
 
 

2022 films
2022 romantic comedy films
2020s South Korean films
2020s Korean-language films
Korean-language Netflix original films
South Korean romantic comedy films
BDSM in films
Films based on South Korean webtoons